This is a list of rulers and office-holders of Ethiopia.

Heads of state 
Emperors of Ethiopia
Presidents of Ethiopia

Heads of government 
Heads of government of Ethiopia

Heads of subdivisions 
Rulers of Bosha
Rulers of the Gibe State of Limu-'Enarya
Rulers of the Gibe State of Gera
Rulers of the Gibe State of Goma
Rulers of the Gibe State of Guma
Rulers of the Gibe state of Jimma
Rulers of the Janjero state of Gimirra
Rulers of Leqa Naqamte
Rulers of Leqa Qellam
Rulers of Shewa
Rulers of Welayta
Mudaito dynasty (Awssa Sultanate)
See also: Monarchies of Ethiopia

Occupation governors 
Rulers during 1936–1941 Italian Occupation
Colonial heads of Italian East Africa
Italian Governors of Addis Ababa
Italian Governors of Amhara
Italian Governors of Galla-Sidama
Italian Governors of Harar
Italian Governors of Showa

Heads of former states 
Kingdom of Aksum: Kings of Axum
Kingdom of D`mt

See also 
 Ethiopian historiography
 Lists of office-holders

Lists of African rulers